Colin Frederick Pearce (1917 – 10 June 2004) was an Australian rugby league referee. He is one of
the most widely known and widely respected referees in the history of rugby league.

Pearce, born in Newtown, New South Wales, was originally more interested in cricket but that changed to rugby league due to 
his fascination with the rules and interpretations of the rules of rugby league. He began
refereeing in 1946, he was promoted to the first grade fixtures towards the end of the 1947 season. He then took 
charge of nine test matches between 1960 and 1967, three World Cup matches in 
1968 and six Grand Finals, his first being in 1955, and then the others between 
1964 and 1968. He enjoyed a career of 343 first grade games. He was 
authoritative yet he allowed the game to flow. He had a keen relationship with the players 
where they would show him respect due to his fair and consistent decision making. His motto 
was that rugby league referees should "eat, sleep and drink the rules of rugby league" He 
was elected to the Rugby League Referee's Examination Board in 1951.

After his retirement from rugby league refereeing, he had a long career as a rugby league commentator in the Sydney electronic and print media, with 2UE, Channel 7 and The Sydney Morning Herald.

Pearce later became a journalist, writing featured columns for The Sun-Herald.

Pearce died from pneumonia on 10 June 2004, aged 86.

Grand finals – match reports
1955, 
1964, 
1965, 
1966, 
1967, 
1968.

References

1917 births
Sportspeople from Sydney
Australian rugby league referees
2004 deaths
Rugby League World Cup referees
20th-century Australian journalists